Robert Jack Hurst (29 December 1933 – 10 February 1996) was an English first-class cricketer active 1952–61 who played for Middlesex. He was born in Hampton Hill; died in Eastbourne.

References

1933 births
1996 deaths
English cricketers
Middlesex cricketers
Marylebone Cricket Club cricketers
L. C. Stevens' XI cricketers